Großdietmanns is a town in the district of Gmünd in the Austrian state of Lower Austria.

Geography
Großdietmanns lies in the valley of the Lainsitz in the Waldviertel in Lower Austria. About 25.6 percent of the municipality is forested.

References

External links
Municipal website

Cities and towns in Gmünd District